Pouteria juruana is a species of tree in the family Sapotaceae. It is native to North and South America.

Conservation
Pouteria juruana is considered an endangered species by the IUCN.

References

juruana
Endangered plants
Trees of Costa Rica
Trees of Peru
Trees of Brazil
Taxonomy articles created by Polbot